Adam and Eve is the fourth studio album by English alternative rock band Catherine Wheel. It was released on 29 July 1997 by Mercury Records. This was the band's last album to feature original bassist Dave Hawes.

The album peaked at No. 11 on the Billboard Top Heatseekers and No. 178 on the Billboard 200.

Background
Bassist Dave Hawes said of the album "Adam And Eve is my personal favourite album. I think we were at our musical peak and Rob and Brian were writing amazing tunes. Add in Bob Ezrin as an executive producer and hey, presto! He produced Lou Reed's Berlin album (a top 5 album of mine), and I think he added some of that magic dust to A and E."

The album cover, designed by Hipgnosis artist Storm Thorgerson, features naked people in rows of boxes. The A.V. Club named the cover one of the hardest to look at, while Gigwise named it one of the 50 sexiest album covers.

Reception 

Response from music critics was generally positive. The Big Takeover magazine named Adam and Eve its "Album of the Year" for 1997, with Radiohead's OK Computer at No. 2. The same site's James Broscheid said that the album was "the band's watershed moment" and that the album was "absolutely brilliant (and 1997's finest!)".

Track listing
(Intro) – 1:23
"Future Boy" – 5:15
"Delicious" – 5:10
"Broken Nose" – 5:20
"Phantom of the American Mother" – 5:43
"Ma Solituda" – 5:12
"Satellite" – 5:14
"Thunderbird" – 6:39
"Here Comes the Fat Controller" – 5:31
"Goodbye" – 7:02
"For Dreaming" – 7:15
(Outro) – 3:00

 Singles

 "Delicious" (1997)
 Europe CD single
 "Delicious" – 4:22
 "Future Boy" – 5:15
 "Judy Staring at the Sun" (with Tanya Donelly) – 4:01
 "Heal" – 6:13
 UK 10" vinyl single
 "Delicious" – 4:22
 "Eat My Dust You Insensitive Fuck" – 8:07
 "Crank" (Live) – 3:55
 "Texture" (Live) – 5:23
 UK CD single
 "Delicious" – 4:22
 "Future Boy" – 5:15
 "Judy Staring at the Sun" (with Tanya Donelly)" – 4:49
 "Heal" – 6:13

 "Broken Nose" (1997)
 "Broken Nose" (Single Version) – 4:19
 "Crank" (Live) – 4:25
 "Texture" (Live) – 4:49
 "Black Metallic" (Live) – 11:04
 UK CD single
 "Broken Nose" (Live) – 5:03
 "Flower to Hide" (Live) – 4:50
 "Heal" (Live) – 7:09
 "I Want to Touch You" (Live) – 5:50
 UK 7" vinyl single
 "Broken Nose"
 "Little Muscle" (Live)

 "Ma Solituda" (1998)
 UK CD single
 "Ma Solituda" – 4:22
 "Delicious" (Single Version) – 4:15
 "Descending Babe" – 6:26
 "Paranoia" – 4:49
 UK 7" vinyl single
 "Ma Solituda" – 4:20
 "Kill Rhythm" (Live) – 5:13
 UK CD single 2
 "Ma Solituda" (Tim Friese-Greene Mix) – 4:58
 "Delicious" (Live) – 4:32
 "Willing to Wait" – 5:22
 "Lucifer" – 4:27

Personnel

Rob Dickinson – vocals, guitar
Brian Futter – lead guitar, backing vocals
Dave Hawes – bass guitar
Neil Sims – percussion, drums
Martin Ditcham – percussion
Tim Friese-Greene – organ, piano
Pete Whittaker – organ, piano
Audrey Riley – cello, string arrangements
Technical
Bob Ezrin – producer
GGGarth, Rob Dickinson, Gil Norton – producer
Randy Staub – engineer, mixing
Gary Winger – engineer
Jon Bailey – assistant engineer
Darren Grahn – digital editing, assistant engineer
Anthony Lycenko – engineer, digital editing, assistant engineer
Storm Thorgerson – artwork
Julien Mills, Peter Curzon – artwork
Tony May – photography

References

External links 

 

Catherine Wheel albums
1997 albums
Albums with cover art by Storm Thorgerson
Albums produced by Bob Ezrin
Albums produced by Gil Norton
Albums produced by Garth Richardson
Mercury Records albums